The Mindel glaciation (also Mindel-Glazial, Mindel-Komplex or, colloquially, Mindel-Eiszeit) is the third youngest glacial stage in the Alps. Its name was coined by Albrecht Penck and Eduard Brückner, who named it after the Swabian river, the Mindel. The Mindel glacial occurred in the Middle Pleistocene; it was preceded by the Haslach-Mindel interglacial (often regarded as part of Günz) and succeeded by the Mindel-Riss interglacial (Holstein interglacial).

The Mindel glaciation is commonly correlated to the Elster glaciation of northern Europe. The more precise timing is controversial since Mindel is commonly correlated to two different marine isotope stages, MIS 12 (478–424 thousand years ago) and MIS 10 (374–337 thousand years ago). This ambiguity is much related to the correlation problem described in more detail in the article 'Elster glaciation'.

See also 
Timeline of glaciation
Glaciology

References

Literature 
 
 
  (3 volumes)

Pleistocene events
Ice ages
Geology of the Alps